Coleophora arachosiae is a moth of the family Coleophoridae. It is found in Afghanistan.

References

arachosiae
Moths of Asia
Moths described in 1994